The 2008-09 Biathlon World Cup/World Cup 7 was held in Vancouver, British Columbia, Canada from March 11–15, 2009.

Schedule of events
The provisional schedule of the event is below.

Medal winners

Men

Women

References

Biathlon World Cup - World Cup 7, 2008-09
March 2009 sports events in Canada
2009 in Canadian sports
Biathlon competitions in Canada
Sports competitions in Vancouver
2009 in British Columbia
2000s in Vancouver